Snows of Aorangi is a 1955 New Zealand short documentary film about New Zealand's mountain landscapes. It was nominated for an Academy Award for Short Subject (Live Action) at the 31st Academy Awards.

Three champion skiers are shown descending the slopes of Aoraki / Mount Cook.

Cast
 Hans Bohny - Skier
 Harvey Clifford - Skier
 Peter Lawlor - Skier

References

External links

Watch Snows of Aorangi at NZ On Screen

1955 films
1950s New Zealand films
1955 documentary films
1955 short films
1950s short documentary films
1950s English-language films
New Zealand short documentary films
National Film Unit